This is a list of statutes enacted by the United States Congress pertaining to the energy industry.

See also 
 List of United States federal environmental statutes
 Fossil fuel regulations in the United States

References

External links
Department of Energy timeline
 GovEnergy Workshop and Trade Show

Energy acts
Energy acts